The Lamborghini Urus is a mid-size luxury crossover SUV manufactured by Italian automobile manufacturer Lamborghini. It was unveiled on 4 December 2017 and was put on the market for the 2018 model year. The name comes from the urus, the ancestor of modern domestic cattle, also known as the aurochs. After four years, Lamborghini hit a major milestone, producing 20,000 of these SUVs, making the Urus the company's best-selling model in the shortest time.

Concept

The Lamborghini Urus concept was unveiled at the 2012 Beijing Auto Show on 23 April 2012. Later, the SUV was also shown at Pebble Beach in 2012. The Urus was reported to have the lowest carbon emissions as compared to its stablemates (i.e. the Porsche Cayenne, Bentley Bentayga and the Audi Q7). The Urus was conceived as a perfect daily driver unlike the other offerings from the brand. The sharp-lined exterior design of the SUV takes heavy influence from the company's V12 flagship, the Aventador. The production version of the SUV was introduced in 2017 with major changes done to the exterior and featuring a different powertrain than that of the concept.

Powertrain

The Lamborghini Urus does not use Lamborghini's hallmark of naturally aspirated V10 (as used in the concept) or V12 engines. Instead, the Urus is powered by a  4.0 L twin-turbocharged V8, a modified version of Audi's 4.0 L V8. This engine has application in other VW Group cars, including both the Porsche Cayenne and Panamera, as well as some of the Audi S and RS models, the A8, the Bentley Continental V8 and the Flying Spur V8. The engine is assembled at a Volkswagen plant in Hungary and is shipped to Lamborghini's assembly plant.

Specifications and performance

The Urus has a front-engine, all-wheel-drive layout, and a top speed of  making it one of the world's fastest production SUVs. The Urus can accelerate from 0– in 3.6 seconds and 0– in 12.8 seconds.

Lamborghini has developed the world's largest set of carbon ceramic disc brakes for the Urus, with  discs in the front and  discs in the rear using ten-piston callipers at the front and single-piston calipers at the rear. The all-wheel drive system of the Urus under normal driving sends 40 percent of the available torque to the front wheels and 60 percent to the rear wheels. It also uses torque vectoring to send as much as 70 percent to the front or 87 percent to the rear, when necessary. The SUV is available with an optional off-road package, which includes modified front and rear bumpers that are better suited to the task.

An unadorned Urus comes standard with a turbocharged 4.0-litre V8 (of torque), an eight-speed ZF 8HP automatic transmission, all-wheel drive, 21-inch wheels, carbon-ceramic brakes, a rear-axle torque-vectoring system, and four-wheel steering. On the inside, the Urus comes with a simulated suede headliner and leather seating surfaces. The front seats feature 12-way power adjustment, position memory and seat heating. And the driver gets to gaze upon a 12.3-inch digital instrument panel. The rear seats can be configured as either a three-person bench or two-person sport seats, and four-zone automatic climate control is standard.

The Urus, like all of Lamborghini's current offerings, features a selection of driving modes, which adapt the suspension to improve the car's performance in various driving conditions. The Lamborghini Urus features Strada (street), Sport, Corsa (track), Terra (dirt), Sabbia (sand), and Neve (snow) driving modes, with the latter three possibly only available on the off-road package offered. The Urus has a seating capacity of four to five people.

The Urus has an EPA fuel economy rating of  combined (city and highway),  city, and  highway.

Special variants

Urus Pearl Capsule 

The Urus Pearl Capsule is a variant of the standard Urus. Customers who buy the Urus Pearl Capsule can customize it to the fullest, with options including being able to choose the colours for two-tone Alcantara seats, to the paint colours. Lamborghini states that there are three pearl paint options available — Verde Mantis, Arancio Borealis and Giallo Inti — providing a modern interpretation of the original solid colours united with Lamborghini tradition. The Black Gloss is painted lower bumpers, rocker covers and roof to create a dramatic two-tone effect, while the 23-inch Taigete alloy wheels in Shiny Black match the colour accents chosen. Technical specifications of the Urus Pearl Capsule such as power and torque remain the same as the standard Urus.

Urus ST-X 
The Urus ST-X is a racing, non-street-legal variant of the standard Urus, built by the Squadra Corse Division of Lamborghini. The concept was unveiled in 2018, at the Lamborghini World Finals. Designed to meet FIA regulations, the production ST-X features a full roll-cage, fire suppression system, and an FT3 fuel tank. The air intakes have been enlarged to better optimize the heat exchange of the 4-liter twin-turbo V8. The car has hexagonal racing exhausts, and 21-inch alloy wheels fitted with Pirelli tires. These changes give a 25% weight reduction compared to the street-legal car. Customer deliveries are scheduled for 2020.

Urus Performante 

The Urus Performante was unveiled by Lamborghini in August 2022 and is a more powerful variant of the SUV. Unlike other Urus special variants, the Performante saw a drastic change in design and performance specifications. It came with better power and downforce while being 104 pounds lighter than other variants.

Recall 
In early December 2020, the NHTSA recalled 2019 and 2020 model year Uruses equipped with the 4.0 litre twin-turbo V8 engine due to a fire risk, since high engine compartment temperatures can cause the fuel line quick connectors to rise to temperatures above the design operating specification limit.  These elevated temperatures can cause the quick connect material to soften, which could result in a fuel leak. All affected models will be retired from showrooms starting on 18 December.

Production
On 4 December 2017, the Urus was unveiled at Lamborghini's Sant'Agata Bolognese headquarters, making it the brand's first SUV since the LM002.
Production began in February 2018 and Lamborghini plans to build 1,000 units in the first year of production, and 3,500 in 2019. However, Lamborghini had to expand their factory in Sant'Agata Bolognese to meet the higher demand. In July 2020, the company announced the 10,000th unit of the Urus.

Earlier appearance of the name
Lamborghini had trademarked the name "Urus" before the introduction of the Lamborghini Estoque at the 2008 Paris Motor Show, and automotive news blogs Jalopnik and Autoblog believed that the name would be applied to what was eventually found to be the Estoque.

See also
 Lamborghini LM002

References

External links 

Official website

Urus
Cars introduced in 2017
2020s cars
Mid-size sport utility vehicles
Luxury crossover sport utility vehicles
All-wheel-drive vehicles
Vehicles with four-wheel steering